Travis Miller (born April 13, 1988) is an American professional stock car racing driver. He last competed part-time in the NASCAR Camping World Truck Series, driving the No. 99 Chevrolet Silverado for MDM Motorsports.

Motorsports career results

NASCAR
(key) (Bold – Pole position awarded by qualifying time. Italics – Pole position earned by points standings or practice time. * – Most laps led.)

Camping World Truck Series

K&N Pro Series East

K&N Pro Series West

ARCA Racing Series
(key) (Bold – Pole position awarded by qualifying time. Italics – Pole position earned by points standings or practice time. * – Most laps led.)

References

External links
 

1988 births
NASCAR drivers
Living people
Sportspeople from Chesapeake, Virginia
Racing drivers from Virginia
ARCA Menards Series drivers